Kingston is an unincorporated community near Stayton, Oregon in Linn County, Oregon, United States. Kingston's post office opened in 1891 and closed in 1920.

References

Unincorporated communities in Linn County, Oregon
1891 establishments in Oregon
Populated places established in 1891
Unincorporated communities in Oregon